An oboe quintet is a chamber music group of five individuals led by an oboist, or music written for this ensemble.

Usually an oboe quintet consists of an oboe and string quartet. 
Pieces for five oboes or five members of the oboe family are uncommon (only two are listed below): double reed quintets are not only rare but almost always include a bassoon.

Of the 105 listed quintets, 35 were composed between 1770 and 1825, none in the next 65 years, 3 between 1880 and 1920, 27 between 1920 and 1980, and 40 since.

The most performed and recorded oboe quintets are probably those by Arnold Bax and Arthur Bliss, who both dedicated their pieces to the British oboist Léon Goossens.

Music for oboe and string quartet
These pieces are for oboe, two violins, viola, and cello unless otherwise indicated.

Other settings

See also
Oboe quartet

Notes

References

Sources
Oboe Quintets at all music.com
Oboe Quintets at the Petrucci Music Library

Chamber music
Classical music lists